Anders Håkan Larsson (born February 6, 1951 in Jönköping) is a Swedish sprint canoer who competed in the mid-1970s. He was eliminated in the semifinals of the K-4 1000 m event at the 1976 Summer Olympics in Montreal.

References
Sports-Reference.com profile

1951 births
Canoeists at the 1976 Summer Olympics
Living people
Olympic canoeists of Sweden
Swedish male canoeists
Sportspeople from Jönköping